La Razón de mi vida (literal translation: "The Reason for My Life") is the autobiography of Eva Perón, First Lady of Argentina from 1946 until her death in 1952. Published in 1951 shortly before Eva Perón's death, it became one of the fastest selling books in Argentine history. Written in a conversational tone, it is largely a compilation of her speeches. Eva Perón shares her perspectives on feminism and the role of women in political life, labor rights, poverty, and, of course, Peronism, the political movement founded by her husband Juan Perón. In 1952, the year she died, the Congress of Argentina ordered the autobiography to be used as a textbook in the Argentine schools.

La Razón de mi Vida was a good seller overseas as well. However, initially, publication in the United States was refused. It has subsequently been published in the United States under the titles My Mission in Life and Evita by Evita.

Criticism

Authorship 
Some sources claim the book was actually written, either entirely or partially, by Spanish journalist Manuel Penella de Silva, and Eva Perón just provided her name. Among those who claim this are Argentine bishop Hernán Benítez, a priest close to Eva Perón in the initial years of Peronism.

References

 Evita: The Real Life of Eva Perón by Marisa Navarro and Nicholas Fraser

Eva Perón
Political autobiographies
Argentine autobiographies
1951 non-fiction books